Jo-Wilfried Tsonga was the defending champion, but chose to compete at the Hopman Cup instead.
Richard Gasquet won the 2013 tournament by beating Nikolay Davydenko 3–6, 7–6(7–4), 6–3 in the final.

Seeds

Draw

Finals

Top half

Bottom half

Qualifying

Seeds

Qualifiers

Draw

First qualifier

Second qualifier

Third qualifier

Fourth qualifier

References
 Main draw
 Qualifying draw

Singles